HD 98800, also catalogued as TV Crateris (TV Crt), is a quadruple star system in the constellation of Crater (the cup). Parallax measurements made by the Hipparcos spacecraft put it at a distance of about 150 light-years (45 parsecs) away, but this value is in high error. The system is located within the TW Hydrae association (TWA), and has received the designation TWA 4.

The system consists of HD 98800 A and HD 98800 B each of which contains two stars. In 2007, a debris disk was discovered orbiting HD 98800 B consisting of two rings which indicates there may be an extrasolar planet orbiting within a distance of 1.5 to 2 astronomical units.

Stellar system 
The system is a member of the TW Hydrae association, a group of young stars. Its membership was derived from the fact that its proper motion is similar to other stars in the group. The system itself is estimated to be around 7-10 million years old.

HD 98800 is a quadruple system, with two pairs of stars orbiting each other. The two pairs are separated by over an arcsecond, so the wide visual orbit is poorly known. A preliminary range of orbits has been calculated, with an orbital period of 300 to 430 years, as well as a moderate eccentricity of 0.3 to 0.6.

The primary component, HD 98800 A, is a K-type main-sequence star with a varying radial velocity. This indicates the presence of another star orbiting it, but light from that star cannot be detected, so the system is a single-lined spectroscopic binary. The secondary system, HD 98800 B, is another spectroscopic binary, but double-lined since both stars (another K-type star and a red dwarf) can be directly detected. The stars in the HD 98800 are much larger than would be expected from their masses: at such a young age, these stars have not condensed into their normal size yet.

Variability 

The brightness of HD 98800 varies slightly between magnitudes 8.91 and 8.98, and it has been given the variable star designation TV Crateris.  The designation TV Crateris includes all four stars and it appears that both components A and B are variable.  Component A varies with a period of 2.521 days which is thought to be its rotation period and it is classified as an RS Canum Venaticorum variable, a dwarf star with an uneven surface brightness that changes brightness as it rotates.  Component B is thought to be a T Tauri star, a pre-main-sequence star surrounded by a disk.  It has been speculated that it is actually a post-T Tauri star and that the variations are caused by irregularities in the tilted disk intercepting the light from the star.

Planetary system

Debris disk 

An infrared excess indicative of a debris disk was first discovered by IRAS. Further observations of the system have been made using Keck and the Spitzer Space Telescope.  The disk consists of two separate belts. The inner ring extends from a distance of 1.5 to 2 astronomical units from the barycenter of the central binary. The outer ring begins at approximately 5.9 astronomical units from the central binary, and extends out an undetermined distance. The gap between the two rings is ~3 astronomical units. The inner ring is thin, while the inner portion of the outer ring is dense.

Dr. Elise Furlan, leader of the Spitzer team that imaged this disk, concludes that the dust generated from the collision of rocky objects in the outer belt should eventually migrate toward the inner disk. But because the system is a double binary system, the dust particles do not evenly fill out the inner disk as expected.

The disk was imaged with ALMA and the high resolution image showed that the disk is likely misaligned with the orbit of the inner binary. The long period of the orbiting inner binary could be responsible for this misalignment and any circumbinary planet forming in this disk would be misaligned with the orbit of the inner binary. Based on VLA observations the disk extends from 3 to 5 astronomical units. The disk is more similar to a massive gas-rich protoplanetary disks than to a debris disks, which is unusual for this kind of age of a circumbinary disk.

Possible planets 
Debris disks are thought to constitute a phase in planetary formation. Because of the gap within the debris disk, the possibility of a planet within the system becomes even more likely. The detected gap could be caused by a unique gravitational relationship between the disk and a possible planet already begun to form, carving out a clear space in the disk. However, the gap could also be gravitational resonance effects of the four stars.

Gallery

See also 
 2M1207
 HD 188753
 UX Tauri
 V4046 Sagittarii

References

External links 
 
 

Circumstellar disks
Crater (constellation)
098800
4
T Tauri stars
TW Hydrae association
Hypothetical planetary systems
Crateris, TV
2084
055505
Durchmusterung objects
RS Canum Venaticorum variables